Changa tuki (also known as Raptor house) is a life-style, dance and music genre derived from electronic music that originated in Caracas, Venezuela in early-1990s and it was a strong trend and present in parties until the late-2000s. The Changa culture was a big mainstream between the people of Venezuela along with other genres such as reggaeton, salsa, and emo. Its dancers and supporters are known as tuki(s). The dance of it is a style of ghetto dance.

They had a particular style of clothing in which they mostly wore tight red pants, sleeveless shirts, caps that almost covered their eyes, Nike shoes in the style of the Air Jordan, and were painted with hydrogen peroxide their whiskers and the tip of the hair. An urban culture that in its great majority was related to the poor classes and especially to the trickery and a kind of thug.

The creators of this style and the greatest DJs were DJ Baba and DJ Irvin, other DJs that could be mentioned were Pacheko, Pocz. Of the most remembered dancers we can mention Elber El Maestro among others.

Portuguese DJs Buraka Som Sistema liked the changa tuki and played many songs of this style and also compose. American DJ Scoop DeVille also expressed how he liked this movement saying that "he has developed a true passion for this".

The most famous meeting place in Caracas where the tuki music was danced and there were good DJs of the genre was Adrena.

Also, many people at that time linked the tuki word offensively and that most of the Tukis were really Venezuelan-style thugs.

References

External links
Documentary video of Changa (in Spanish)	
Changa tuki dancers
tuki dancer
tuki dancer girls

  

Venezuelan music
House music genres